Afroturbonilla is a genus of sea snails, marine gastropod mollusks in the family Pyramidellidae, the pyrams and their allies.

Species
There are three known species within the genus Afroturbonilla, these include:
 Afroturbonilla engli (Peñas & Rolán, 1997)
 Afroturbonilla hattenbergeriana Peñas, Rolán & Schander, 1999
 Afroturbonilla multitudinalis Peñas & Rolán, 2002

References

External links
 To World Register of Marine Species

Pyramidellidae